Norway was represented by Elisabeth Andreassen, with the song '"I evighet", at the 1996 Eurovision Song Contest, which took place on 18 May at the Oslo Spektrum, following Secret Garden's victory for Norway in Dublin the previous year. "I evighet" was chosen as the Norwegian entry at the Melodi Grand Prix on 30 March. This was the last of four Eurovision appearances as a main performer by Andreassen, a record shared with Lys Assia, Fud Leclerc, Valentina Monetta and Peter, Sue and Marc.

Before Eurovision

Melodi Grand Prix 1996 
The final was held at the studios of the Norwegian Broadcasting Corporation in Oslo, hosted by Tande-P. Eight songs took part with the winner being chosen by voting from regional juries. Other participants included three-time Norwegian representative and MGP regular Jahn Teigen (as one of the duo To Tenorer) and Geir Rønning, who would later represent Finland in the Eurovision Song Contest 2005.

At Eurovision 
The European Broadcasting Union granted Norway, as the host nation, exemption from an audio-only qualifying round which took place on 20 March with all 29 other participants competing to avoid the bottom seven placings which would mean early elimination from the 1996 contest and non-representation in Oslo.

On the night of the final Andreassen performed 12th in the running order, following Estonia and preceding France. At the close of voting "I evighet" had received 114 points, placing Norway second of the 23 entries. The highest marks received were three 10s from the Netherlands, Slovenia and Sweden – during the 1975-2003 period at the contest, "I evighet" was the best placed song without any 12 points. The Norwegian jury awarded its 12 points to Portugal.

Andreassen is one of five artists – along with Lys Assia, Gigliola Cinquetti, Linda Martin and Dima Bilan – to have finished both first and second at Eurovision.

Voting

Qualifying round 
As the host nation, Norway automatically qualified for the final.

Final

References

External links 
Full national final on nrk.no

1996
Countries in the Eurovision Song Contest 1996
1996
Eurovision
Eurovision